Alexandra Waterbury is an American ballet dancer and fashion model. In September 2018 she began a lawsuit against her former boyfriend and his employer—principal dancer Chase Finlay and New York City Ballet—and several other parties, alleging that the individuals named shared sexually explicit images and videos of Waterbury without her consent, and that the institutions named were co-liable.

Early life 
Waterbury is from Old Forge, New York. She trained at the School of American Ballet (SAB) in New York City from 2013 to 2016.

Lawsuit against NYCB 

In September 2018 Waterbury began a civil action in New York County Supreme Court against NYCB principal dancers Chase Finlay, Amar Ramasar and Zachary Catazaro; NYCB patron Jared Longhitano; New York City Ballet; and SAB. Her lawsuit claimed harm by Finlay for allegedly taking and sharing sexually explicit photos and videos of Waterbury without her knowledge or consent, and by Ramasar, Catazaro, Longhitano, NYCB and SAB for allegedly contributing to that harm in various ways.  

All defendants disputed key factual allegations made in the complaint as well as their liability as a matter of law; they all filed motions to dismiss.

On September 25, 2020, Waterbury's lawsuits against the New York City Ballet, Amar Ramasar and Zachary Catazaro were dismissed. The case against Chase Finlay remains.

Waterbury's lawsuit led to Finlay's resignation and the firing of Ramasar and Catazaro. In April 2019, an arbitrator ordered Ramasar and Catazaro reinstated; Catazaro decided not to rejoin the company.

Career 

Waterbury is signed with Wilhelmina Models, City Models, and Munich Models. In July 2016 Waterbury was the cover-girl L'Officiel Thailand. In October 2017 Waterbury was photographed by Isaac Anthony for an editorial in Design Scene. In March 2018 she was featured in a fashion editorial for L'Officiel'''s American publication. In October 2018 Waterbury modeled for Lululemon Athletica's Royal Ballet Collection.

Waterbury was scheduled to dance as a guest artist in Ballez's production of Giselle'' in 2020. The show was postponed to June 2021 due to the COVID-19 pandemic in the United States.

Personal life 

Waterbury was in a relationship with Chase Finlay from 2016 until 2018. Waterbury was a student at Columbia University's School of General Studies and a member of the Columbia Ballet Collaborative. She graduated from Columbia in 2021.

See also
List of female dancers

References 

Living people
American ballerinas
American female models
Columbia University School of General Studies alumni
School of American Ballet alumni
People from Herkimer County, New York
Year of birth missing (living people)